Eagle Creek is a census-designated place (CDP) in Centre County, Pennsylvania, United States. It was first listed as a CDP prior to the 2020 census.

The CDP is in central Centre County, in the southern part of Union Township. It is bordered to the northeast by the borough of Unionville. Eagle Creek CDP sits in the valley of Bald Eagle Creek, a northeastward-flowing tributary of the West Branch Susquehanna River. Dicks Run flows through the CDP from northwest to southeast to join Bald Eagle Creek at the southern border of the CDP.

U.S. Route 220 Alternate runs through the CDP, following the Bald Eagle Creek valley. It leads northeast through Unionville  to Interstate 80 at Milesburg and southwest  to Port Matilda.

Demographics

References 

Census-designated places in Centre County, Pennsylvania
Census-designated places in Pennsylvania